Shanaqi or Shenaqi or Shanqi may refer to:
 Shanaqi-ye Olya
 Shanaqi-ye Sofla